Bell boots, or overreach boots,  are a type of protective boot worn by a horse. They encircle the horse's ankle, and protect the back of the pastern and the heels of the animal.

Uses of bell boots
Bell boots are usually worn to prevent overreaching (when the horse "grabs" his front heels with the toes of his back feet, resulting in injury), or if the horse is wearing shoe studs, to protect him from accidentally injuring himself with the stud of the opposing hoof. In some cases a horse with corrective or poor shoeing wears shoes that protrude behind the foot, making it easier for a horse to overreach and spring or completely pull off the shoe. This is most commonly seen when the horse is jumping, working in mud or on a slippery surface, running cross-country, or longeing, and bell boots can help prevent this from occurring. Bell boots are occasionally worn when shipping a horse, if the bandages or boots used do not provide protection to the heel region, or if a horse tends to pull his front shoes by stepping on them with his back feet. Bell boots are also sometimes used when the horse is turned out, for extra protection or to help prevent him from accidentally pulling a shoe if he is especially exuberant while playing.

Applying bell boots

Bell boots are usually made of rubber. They may be open, with Velcro or other fastenings to close them, or closed and slipped on over the hoof. Although open bell boots are the easiest to apply, close bell boots are more secure  as they have no chance of slipping off.

To apply closed bell boots, it is easiest to turn them inside out, before slipping them over the toe of the foot. It may also help to place them in warm water so they will expand before trying to put them on.

A correctly sized bell boot should just touch the ground behind the bulbs of the heel while the horse is standing. The mouth of the bell boot should be just loose enough to fit a finger or two between it and the horse's pastern.

Causes of discomfort
Most horses do not mind wearing bell boots and suffer no adverse effects when they are used properly. However, even a correctly fitted bell boot may chafe and cause discomfort to a horse if the material the boot is made of is exceedingly stiff or if the horse has especially sensitive skin.

Horse protective equipment